Petr Veselý (born 7 June 1971) is a former Czech football player.

Veselý played mostly for Baník Ostrava and Petra Drnovice in the Gambrinus liga. He also represented the Czech Republic twice at the international level.

External links
 

1971 births
Living people
Czech footballers
Czech Republic international footballers
Czech First League players
FC Baník Ostrava players
FC Hradec Králové players
ŠK Slovan Bratislava players
Sportspeople from Přerov
FK Drnovice players
Patraikos F.C. players
Czech expatriate footballers
Expatriate footballers in Greece
Czech expatriate sportspeople in Greece

Association football defenders
FC Hlučín players